is a Japanese former competitive figure skater. She is the 1993 World Junior champion, 1992 NHK Trophy silver medalist, 1997 Winter Universiade champion, and a three-time Japan national bronze medalist.

Skating career 
Koiwai finished 8th at the 1992 World Junior Championships in Hull, Quebec, Canada. At the 1993 Junior Worlds in Seoul, she placed first in both segments and was awarded the gold medal ahead of Lisa Ervin and Tanja Szewczenko.

Coached by Machiko Yamada, who had trained Midori Ito, Koiwai was routinely landing the triple Axel jump by 1994. However, she faced several chronic injuries of her right foot, which severely impeded her efforts.

In 1996, she made her only appearance at the senior World Championships, finishing 16th. In 1997, she won gold at the Winter Universiade and then retired from competition.

Later life 
Koiwai graduated from Tokai Women's College near her hometown, Nagoya. She now works as a programming director for Tōkai Television in Japan.

Competitive highlights

References

Navigation

1975 births
Living people
Japanese female single skaters
Sportspeople from Aichi Prefecture
World Junior Figure Skating Championships medalists
Universiade medalists in figure skating
Universiade gold medalists for Japan
Universiade bronze medalists for Japan
Competitors at the 1995 Winter Universiade
Competitors at the 1997 Winter Universiade